The 1966 Brabantse Pijl was the sixth edition of the Brabantse Pijl cycle race and was held on 7 April 1966. The race started and finished in  Brussels. The race was won by Jan Janssen.

General classification

References

1966
Brabantse Pijl